Manavely is a Census Town in Ariyankuppam Commune in the Union Territory of Puducherry, India.

Geography
Manavely is bordered by Kakkayanthope in the north, Veerampattinam in the east,  Sankaraparani River in the south and Ariyankuppam (West) in the West

Demographics
Manavely has an average literacy rate of 81.49%, male literacy is 88.89%, and female literacy is 74.13%. In Manavely, 10% of the population is under 6 years of age.

Transport
Manavely is located at 1.5 km from Ariyankuppam on Ariyankuppam - Chinna Veerapatinam Road. One can reach Ariyankuppam by any local bus from Pondicherry to Bahoor, Madukarai and Karaiyanputtur running via Ariyankuppam. From Ariyankuppam, you have to walk 1.5 km towards east to reach Manavely. Manavely can also be reached directly by PRTC Bus (Route No. 2A) running between Pondicherry and Chinna Veerampatinam.

Road Network
Manavely is connected to Pondicherry by Ariyankuppam–Chinna Veerampatinam Road. There is another road from Manavely to NH-45A namely Manavely Main Road. It starts from NH-45A near Ariyankuppam Police Station.

Tourism

Chinna Veerampatinam Beach
Chinna Veerampatinam Beach is located at a distance of 1.5 km from Manavely.  The Windflower Resort & Spa is located in Chinna Veerampatinam. Sankaraparani River joins Bay of Bengal at Chinna Veerampatinam

Politics
After Delimitation, Manavely become a State Assembly Constituency which comes under Puducherry (Lok Sabha constituency).

References

External links
 Official website of the Government of the Union Territory of Puducherry

Ariyankuppam
Cities and towns in Puducherry district